Qila is a Palestinian village located  north-west of Hebron. The village is in the Hebron Governorate Southern West Bank. According to the Palestinian Central Bureau of Statistics, the village had a population of 918 in mid-year 2006. The primary health care facilities for the village are at Qila designated by the Ministry of Health as level 1 and at Beit Ula, Kharas or Nuba where the healthcare is at level 2.

History
Many scholars identify Qila with the biblical Keilah, mentioned in 1 Samuel.

Footnotes

Bibliography

 (p. 86)
 (pp. 314, 357)
 (Check pp. 341–343; pp. 350-351)

External links
Welcome To Qila
Survey of Western Palestine, Map 21:    IAA, Wikimedia commons

Villages in the West Bank
Hebron Governorate
Municipalities of the State of Palestine